Royal Air Force Geilenkirchen, more commonly known as RAF Geilenkirchen, was a Royal Air Force station in the North Rhine-Westphalia region of Germany, built by the British who used the facility mainly as an airfield for RAF fighter squadrons from May 1953 until 21 January 1968.

History

Geilenkirchen squadrons
No 2 Squadron RAF – 1955–1957; operated the Gloster Meteor FR.9 and later the Supermarine Swift FR.5.
No. 3 Squadron RAF – 1953–1957 and 1959–1961, 1961–68; operated the Hawker Hunter F.4, the Gloster Javelin FAW.4 and the English Electric Canberra B(I).8 (1961–68).
No. 5 Squadron RAF – 1962–1965; operated the Gloster Javelin FAW.9.
No. 11 Squadron RAF – 1959–1965; operated the Gloster Meteor NF.11 and later the Gloster Javelin FAW.4, FAW.5, FAW.9.
No. 59 Squadron RAF – 1957–1961; operated the Canberra B.2 and B(I).8 (1957–61).
No. 92 Squadron RAF – 1965–1968; operated the English Electric Lightning F.2, F.2A.
No. 96 Squadron RAF – 1958–1959; operated the Gloster Javelin FAW.4.
No. 234 Squadron RAF – 1954–1957; operated the Canadair Sabre F.4 and later the Hawker Hunter F.4.
No. 256 Squadron RAF – 1958-1958; operated the Gloster Meteor NF.11.

Post RAF history
The RAF handed over the station to German Luftwaffe in March 1968. The Germans used the airfield as home for a Surface-to-Surface Missile Wing equipped with Pershing missiles with support from the United States Army.

Current use
In 1980, the station became NATO Air Base Geilenkirchen, the main operating base for NATO's Airborne Early Warning and Control force, operating 14 Boeing E-3A Sentry aircraft.

See also
List of aircraft of the Royal Air Force
List of former Royal Air Force stations
Royal Air Force station

References

Citations

Bibliography

External links
Silent Sentinel – brief history of 92 Sqn Lightning F2s 
"Miss Demeanour", a (now famous) former RAF Geilenkirchen Hunter F.4
NATO AWACS Homepage

Military units and formations established in 1953
Royal Air Force stations in Germany
Military units and formations disestablished in 1968
Airports in North Rhine-Westphalia